The 2006 United States House of Representatives election in South Dakota took place on Tuesday, November 7, 2006. Voters selected a representative for their single At-Large district, who ran on a statewide ballot.

Democratic incumbent Stephanie Herseth was challenged by Republican nominee Chairman of the Shannon County (now known as Oglala Lakota County) Republican Party Bruce Whalen. Neither candidate was opposed in the June 6, 2006 primary. George W. Bush won in this district 60% to 38% over John Kerry in 2004.

Election results
Despite the strong performance of Republicans in many of the state elections held that year, including Incumbent Republican Governor Mike Rounds's 62%-36% victory over former state Representative Jack Billion, Herseth was nevertheless reelected by a landslide margin.

References

United States House of Representatives
South Dakota

2006